Henry Gordon may refer to:

People
 Henry Gordon (preacher) (1816–1898), American preacher and church planter
 C. Henry Gordon (1883–1940), American actor
 Harry Gordon (entertainer) (1893–1957), British performer 
 Henry C. Gordon (1925–1996), American astronaut
 Henry Gordon (magician) (1919–2009), Canadian magician and writer
 Sir Henry Percy Gordon, 2nd Baronet (1806–1876)

Name
 Henry Gordon (given name)

See also

Harry Gordon (disambiguation)